Daphne Scoccia (born ) is an Italian actress. Her film credits include Fiore and Niente di serio.

References

External links

1995 births
21st-century Italian actresses
Living people
Place of birth missing (living people)